Nosrat Irandoost (born May 1, 1949) is a retired Iranian  football player and manager. He is currently technical director of Malavan.

Playing career
Irandoost spent his entire career playing for Malavan. In 1976, he helped the team  win the Hazfi Cup. In 1977, Irandoost was hired as a player-coach by his team Malavan. This arrangement lasted shortly, as he retired in 1981.

Irandoost was capped by the Iran national football team once, playing in a game against Turkey in the 1974 RCD Cup.

Managerial career
After his retirement in 1981, Irandoost started his managerial career in 1997 with Malavan F.C. His tenure ended when the team hired Mohammad Ahmadzadeh in 2000. After taking a short break from coaching, Irandoost was hired was an assistant coach to Majid Jalali at Pas Tehran. However, when Jalili was fired and replaced with Homayoun Shahrokhi, Irandoost also found himself out of a job.

In 2007, Irandoost was hired as the manager of Shahin Bushehr. However, his placement was short-lived, as the team did poorly, placing 8th in the 2007–08 Azadegan League and making a first round exit from the Hazfi Cup. Irandoost continued his managerial career the following season at Shahrdari Bandar Abbas. Much like his previous tenure, his time at the club ended early due to poor results.

Irandoost became the head coach of 2nd Division club Chooka Talesh in 2011, before returning to Malavan in 2014.

References

Living people
Iranian footballers
Malavan players
Iranian football managers
1949 births
Association football midfielders
Malavan F.C. managers
Shahin Bushehr F.C. managers